Udathalawinna is a village situated in Kandy district, Sri Lanka. This is located to the north of Kandy city. This village is 495m above sea level. This village's average temperature is 24 degrees Celsius. The annual rainfall is about 2500–3000 mm. The majority of the people here are Muslims. There are also Sinhalese and Tamils living here. The languages that are spoken here are Tamil and Sinhala. There are about 55,366 people living in this village. Most of the children go to the village school. The people in the village hold sport functions in the village which entertain the people. Cricket matches are held between sports club several times in a year. The population is increasing promptly while the improvements are being made due to the village being a place which provides both desires and needs. A stream flows through the village. Many people visit there to fulfill their needs such as bathing and getting water for consumption. There is a Railway station in the village which was built by the British government.

Udathalawinna is popular for its Jamiul Azhar Central College, which is situated in this village. It has produced several renowned intellectuals, scholars, religious leaders, professors, lawyers, doctors, engineers, computer experts, sportsmen, school principals, teachers, poets, authors, traders and innovative industrialists. Udathalawinna also has a famous Grand Mosque where the ancestors had dignified the villagers to be always as one group.. There are several renowned people, such as Nizar Master Fareel, Nawfer, Uwais, Punniyameen, who have brought Udathalawinna to a spotlight .

External links

Populated places in Central Province, Sri Lanka